The King Edward Hotel (also known as the "King Eddy") is a former hotel in Calgary, Alberta. After being abandoned, it was incorporated into the Downtown East Village revitalization project.

History
The King Edward Hotel was built in phases between 1905 and 1910 on 9th Avenue Southeast. It housed one of Calgary's oldest bars.

It closed its doors in 2004.

In 2012, the inside and outside of the building were scanned for historical preservation, and to assist in the design of the National Music Centre.  A subset of the exterior scan can be viewed as the building existed before being dismantled in 2013.

Incorporation in National Music Centre

In May 2008, the National Music Centre was selected through a competitive process to work with Calgary Municipal Land Corporation on the King Eddy rejuvenation project.

In October 2013, crews started the tedious task of taking the century-old hotel apart brick-by-brick. The bricks were wrapped and stored on pallets inside a shipping container to preserve them while crews worked to reassemble the structure. Even the hotel's front door step was saved to be used again.

The $168 million National Music Centre, including the rebuilt King Edward Hotel, opened in 2016. The National Music Centre includes performance spaces, recording studios, broadcasting facilities and an extensive collection of artifacts including the Canada Music Hall of Fame and the Canadian Country Music Hall of Fame.

Re-opening as live venue
In 2018, the King Edwared Hotel reopened as a permanent live music venue.

References

Hotels in Alberta
Buildings and structures in Calgary
Historic buildings in Calgary